The slaty tanager (Creurgops dentatus) is a species of bird in the family Thraupidae. It is found in Bolivia and Peru.
Its natural habitat is subtropical or tropical moist montane forests.

References 

slaty tanager
Birds of the Yungas
slaty tanager
slaty tanager
slaty tanager

Taxonomy articles created by Polbot